Shaikh Karamat Ali (? - 8 September 1951) was a Pakistani Muslim League politician from Punjab, Pakistan.

Ali was a lawyer, by training. In the 1946 Punjab Provincial Assembly election, he stood as a Muslim League candidate from the North-Eastern Towns constituency, reserved for Muslims. Ali defeated the incumbent legislator —Maulvi Mazhar Ali Azhar, General Secretary of the Majlis-e-Ahrar-ul-Islam— comfortably, by a margin of about six thousand votes. In the Assembly, Ali opposed the Congress-Unionist coalition government, and was particularly noted for his animosity towards Hindus. Subsequently, he was elected by the Assembly to the Constituent Assembly of India but abdicated attendance until the Mountbatten Plan sanctioned the creation of Pakistan and its own constituent assembly. 

He continued to be a member of the inaugural Provincial Assembly of West Punjab and held the Ministries of Education, Public Works, Health, and Local Governance. C. October 1948, Prime Minister Liaquat Ali Khan requested of Iftikhar Hussain Khan Mamdot —then Chief Minister of Pakistan— to dismiss Ali, on allegations of corruption but Mamdot, facing intense factionalism, did not agree. Ali died on 8 September 1951, suffering from protracted illness.

Notes

References 

1951 deaths
Year of birth missing
Pakistan Muslim League politicians
Members of the Provincial Assembly of the Punjab
Members of the Constituent Assembly of Pakistan